Dobrolet may refer to one of the following

 Dobrolyot, an early Soviet aviation company, a precursor of Aeroflot.
 Dobrolet (cargo airline), a former Russian cargo airline.
 Dobrolet (low-cost airline), a defunct Russian low-cost airline.
 Dobrolet, Russia, a village in Russia (:ru:Добролёт (посёлок)).